At the Villa Rose, also known as House of Mystery, is a 1940 British detective film directed by Walter Summers and starring Kenneth Kent and Judy Kelly. It is based on the novel At the Villa Rose by A.E.W. Mason featuring the French detective Inspector Hanaud.

Cast
 Kenneth Kent as Inspector Hanaud 
 Judy Kelly as Celia Harland 
 Peter Murray-Hill as Harry Wethermill 
 Walter Rilla as Mr. Ricardo 
 Ruth Maitland as Madame Dauvray 
 Antoinette Cellier as Adele Rossignol 
 Clifford Evans as Tace 
 Martita Hunt as Helen Vaquier 
 Ronald Adam as Mons. Besnard

Reception
Allmovie called the film a "modest but intriguing British melodrama."

References

External links
 

1940 films
1940 mystery films
British detective films
Films shot at Associated British Studios
1940s English-language films
Films directed by Walter Summers
1940 crime films
British black-and-white films
1940s British films